Mallika Karki is a Nepali singer. 

She received the National Boster Music Award (2019). She had previously received Kalika Music Award, Sagarmatha Music Award, Music Khabar Music Award, and Bindabasini Music Award.

References

Living people
21st-century Nepalese women singers
Year of birth missing (living people)
Place of birth missing (living people)